Charcot's cholangitis triad is the combination of jaundice; fever, usually with rigors; and right upper quadrant abdominal pain. It occurs as a result of ascending cholangitis (an infection of the bile duct in the liver). When the presentation also includes low blood pressure and mental status changes, it is known as Reynolds' pentad. It is named for Jean-Martin Charcot.

See also
 Charcot's neurologic triad (scanning speech, intention tremor, nystagmus) – a triad described in association with multiple sclerosis.
 Reynolds' pentad.

References

Diagnostic gastroenterology
Medical triads